Gori City Hall (goris meria) is an administrative building of Gori, Georgia, a city in eastern Georgia, which serves as the regional capital of Shida Kartli.

History 
According to media reports, the hall has been a target of shelling by Russian troops during the 2008 Russian Georgian war. Until 2010, there was a monument to Joseph Stalin in front of the City Hall who was born in this city.

References

Gori
Buildings and structures in Gori, Georgia